Winston Churchill Rea (born 1950 or 1951), known as Winkie Rea, is a Northern Irish former loyalist paramilitary commander who was the former leader of the Red Hand Commando (RHC) loyalist paramilitary organisation that was in Northern Ireland during the Troubles. Part of a leading loyalist family, he has been active in paramilitarism since the early years of the conflict.

Red Hand Commando
Rea was born in about 1950 or 1951 in Belfast, Northern Ireland, and brought up as a Protestant on the loyalist Shankill Road. Although his full name was Winston Churchill Rea, he was better known by his nickname Winkie. Sometime after the outbreak of the Troubles, his parents emigrated to Australia to get away from the violence. In his youth he often attended the rallies of Ian Paisley. It is not known when he joined the Red Hand Commando, a loyalist paramilitary organisation founded in 1972 by John McKeague and closely affiliated with the larger Ulster Volunteer Force (UVF). He eventually rose in its ranks to later become leader, succeeding McKeague.

Rea met Elizabeth Spence, daughter of UVF leader Gusty Spence, who was imprisoned at the time. In April 1972, he travelled to Long Kesh Prison, where he obtained permission from Spence to marry her. Immediately after the wedding, Spence absconded, and he remained on the run for four months.

Imprisonment
In 1973, Rea was imprisoned for eight years after being found in possession of a Sterling submachine gun and for having driven two cars to and from the scene of a loyalist attack on Divis Street in nationalist west Belfast. On 18 February 1973, Catholic postmen Michael Coleman and David McAleese were gunned down and killed by a passing car. Rea was tried in a Diplock Court where he had protested his innocence to no avail. Despite his association with the Red Hand Commando, he joined Spence in the UVF section of Long Kesh.

In 1981, Rea was released from prison. The same year, he appeared on an edition of Ulster Television's Counterpoint current affairs programme, arguing against Ian Paisley's evocation of a "Carson trail", and calling for young people not to follow his path. He staged a silent protest against Paisley, by hanging a placard outside his home near Carlisle Circus at the bottom of the Crumlin Road. The placard read: "Remember the loyalist prisoners for after all 50 per cent of them are ex-Orangemen". Carlisle Circus is the assembly point for Orangemen at the start of their annual 12 July parade.

CLMC ceasefire
Rea played a role in negotiating the Combined Loyalist Military Command ceasefire, in 1994. He became active in the Progressive Unionist Party (PUP), linked to the Ulster Volunteer Force, and was the last candidate on the party's "top-up" list for the Northern Ireland Forum election of 1996, but was not elected. However, he formed part of the PUP's Good Friday Agreement negotiating team.

Later activity
In 1998, Rea was arrested and questioned about the murder of Frankie Curry, a former Red Hand Commando member and a relative by marriage of Rea.  He was subsequently released, without charge. During a loyalist feud, in 2000, Rea's house was broken into by members of the C Company of the rival Ulster Freedom Fighters, led by Johnny Adair.  They destroyed many of his possessions.

Rea later founded the 1st Shankill Northern Ireland Supporters' Club, and acted as its treasurer.

In 2011, he attended the wake of Michaela McAreavey, where he was warmly embraced by Martin McGuinness. McAreavey was the daughter of Mickey Harte, the Tyrone GAA manager. She was murdered while on her honeymoon in Mauritius.

Murder charges
In 2015 police attempted to gain access to interview tapes held at Boston College in relation to an investigation into Rea's activities. Police had stated that Rea was being investigated over offences of "the utmost gravity" after challenging an injunction Rea had obtained to prevent the transfer of the tapes. The tapes were part of project by the college in which both loyalists and republicans had been interviewed about their experiences and activities during the Troubles. The tapes had already been at the centre of controversy after police had attempted to obtain some in relation to the murder of Jean McConville. Police were awarded permission to hear the tapes by the courts in February 2015.

In June 2016, following detailed examination of the tapes by police, Rea was charged with the murders of two Catholic civilians during the Troubles, two attempted murders, membership of the Red Hand Commando and several other lesser charges, with twelve charges in total brought against him.

References

1950s births
Living people
Paramilitaries from Belfast
Progressive Unionist Party politicians
Red Hand Commando members